Ron Tomme (October 24, 1931 – January 29, 2005) was an American actor, best known for his long-running role as Bruce Sterling on the CBS soap opera Love of Life from 1959 to 1980. He also did a short term role on the ABC soap opera, Ryan's Hope and the CBS prime-time serial Dallas. He is buried at Fairview Cemetery in Linden, Michigan.

External links

1931 births
2005 deaths
American male soap opera actors
Male actors from Michigan
Burials in Michigan
20th-century American male actors